Albert Giger (7 October 1946 – 4 September 2021) was a Swiss cross country skier who competed in the early 1970s. He won a bronze in the 4 x 10 km cross-country skiing relay at the 1972 Winter Olympics in Sapporo. He was also a five-times winner of the Engadin Skimarathon.

References

External links 
 Max Bardone Fan Club on the 1972 4 x 10km bronze (Switzerland) 

1946 births
2021 deaths
Cross-country skiers at the 1968 Winter Olympics
Cross-country skiers at the 1972 Winter Olympics
Cross-country skiers at the 1976 Winter Olympics
Olympic medalists in cross-country skiing
Swiss male cross-country skiers
Medalists at the 1972 Winter Olympics
Olympic bronze medalists for Switzerland
Olympic cross-country skiers of Switzerland
People from Imboden District
Sportspeople from Graubünden
20th-century Swiss people